The Royal Abbey of Saint-Denis is a book about the history of the Royal Abbey of Saint-Denis by Sumner McKnight Crosby.

1987 non-fiction books
Architecture books
Yale University Press books